Live in London: Babymetal World Tour 2014 (titled Live in London internationally) is the fourth live video album by Japanese band Babymetal, released in Japan on May 20, 2015 through BMD Fox Records and Toy's Factory, and in Europe on October 30, 2015 through earMusic. It contains two concerts that the band gave in London as part of its first world tour, Babymetal World Tour 2014, taking place on July 7, 2014 at The Forum, and on November 8, 2014 at the O2 Academy Brixton.

Background 
On May 7, 2014 Babymetal announced their first world tour, called the Babymetal World Tour 2014, with a tour date set in London, United Kingdom on July 7, 2014 at the Electric Ballroom. However, this would later be later moved to a bigger venue located at The Forum as a result of tickets quickly selling out. On August 16, 2014, after the end of the festival Summer Sonic Festival 2014 in Chiba, Japan, the band announced an extra leg of the tour, the Babymetal Back to the USA / UK Tour 2014, with one of two added shows taking place in London on November 8, 2014 at O2 Academy Brixton.

On February 27, 2015, the band announced a video release of the two shows on their official website, in 2-DVD and Blu-ray formats, while on April 9, 2015, the release was announced for inclusion in "The One" member-exclusive box set Babymetal World Tour 2014 Apocalypse. A trailer for Live in London: Babymetal World Tour 2014 was posted online on April 23, 2015. The show at O2 Academy Brixton was pre-screened at five movie theaters in Japan on May 15, 2015, while a digest of the shows was regularly broadcast by Yunika Vision onto Tokyo Station and Seibu-Shinjuku Station from May 11 to May 20, 2015. On October 14, 2015, the band announced the video's release in Europe set for October 30, 2015.

The album was also released in vinyl format on August 25, 2021 to commemorate the band's tenth anniversary.

Content 
The first concert was performed at The Forum on July 7, 2014. The show began with a video introduction with a Star Wars-inspired opening crawl declaring "all metal roads lead to Europe", and then commencing with the opening track "Babymetal Death", with the members of the band performing the rest of the songs from Babymetal with the accompanying Kami Band playing the music live. After performing "Gimme Chocolate!!", the three members leave the stage until the encore. When performing the final song "Ijime, Dame, Zettai", the introductory narration is in English, contrary to previous shows.

The second concert was performed at Brixton Academy on November 8, 2014. The show played through a similar set list, with the performance featuring lore surrounding the Fox Gods and other legends. At the closing of the performance, the band marked the conclusion of Metal Resistance Episode II by performing the new song, "Road of Resistance".

Reception 
Josh Saco from The Quietus positively reviewed the performance at The Forum, calling the performance authentic and more than just "mere exploitation" of the genre, praising the staff of Babymetal for knowing the genre, "from devastating drums, to screeching guitars". Colin McQuistan of HuffPost positively reviewed the performance at Brixton Academy, stating that compared to the "astonishing" performance at The Forum, the band had "a meaner, more purposeful edge", and noting that the larger capacity of the venue suited the band members as they performed.

Live in London: Babymetal World Tour 2014 peaked at number three on the Oricon weekly DVD chart and simultaneously topped the Blu-ray chart for the week of June 1, 2015, with first-week sales of 5,510 and approximately 13,000 copies, respectively. In addition to topping the sub-charts for Blu-ray music videos, Babymetal became the first teenage act ever to have two consecutive number-one Blu-ray videos. After its release in the United Kingdom, the video also managed to peak at number nine on the Official Charts Company Music Videos chart for the week of November 1, 2015.

Track listing 

Notes
 "Mischiefs of Metal Gods" is not listed in the track listings of any format.

Personnel 
Credits adapted from Live in London: Babymetal World Tour 2014 booklet.
 Su-metal (Suzuka Nakamoto) – lead and background vocals, dance
 Yuimetal (Yui Mizuno) – lead and background vocals (credited as "scream"), dance
 Moametal (Moa Kikuchi) – lead and background vocals (credited as "scream"), dance

Charts

Weekly charts

Daily charts

Release history

References

External links 
 

Babymetal video albums
2015 video albums
2021 live albums
Live video albums
Albums recorded at the Brixton Academy